Anne McEnroe (born c.1956) is an American actress who had roles in the 1980s and 1990s, including Wall Street and Beetlejuice. She is married to Edward R. Pressman, whom she met on the set of The Hand, which he produced.

Filmography

References

External links

Annie McEnroe(Aveleyman)

1956 births
Living people
20th-century American actresses
21st-century American actresses
American film actresses
American television actresses